Bittersweet, bitter-sweet, or bitter sweet may refer to:

Biology
 A vine in the nightshade family, Solanum dulcamara
 Some species of vines in the genus Celastrus, including American bittersweet (C. scandens) and Oriental bittersweet (C. orbiculatus)
 Glycymerididae family of shellfish, saltwater clams known as bittersweets or Dog cockles

Film and television
 Bitter Sweet (1933 film), a 1933 film based on the Noël Coward operetta
 Bitter Sweet (1940 film), a 1940 film based on the Noël Coward operetta
 Bitter Sweet (2009 film), a 2009 Thai-American romantic comedy film
 Bitter Sweet (TV series), a 2015 Taiwanese television series
 Sweetbitter (TV series), a 2018 American television series

Literature
 Bittersweet: How Sorrow and Longing Make Us Whole, a 2022 book by American author Susan Cain

Music
 Bitter Sweet (operetta), a 1929 operetta in three acts written by Noël Coward
 Bitter:Sweet, an electronic indie rock band from Los Angeles
 The Bittersweets, an American music duo

Albums 
 Bittersweet, a 1972 album by Chairmen of the Board, or the title song
 Bitter Sweet (The Main Ingredient album), 1972
 Bitter Sweet (King album), 1985
 Bittersweet, a 1993 album by Clifford T. Ward
 BitterSweet, a 1993 album by Stephanie Nakasian
 Bitter Sweet (Kim Richey album), 1997
 Bittersweet, a 1998 album by Jenny Choi
 Bittersweet, a 2000 repackaging of the Wind on the Water by Crosby & Nash
 Bitter Sweet (Casiopea album), 2000
 Bittersweet (Blu Cantrell album), 2003
 Bittersweet, a 2009 album by David Rhodes
 Bittersweet (Mark Isham and Kate Ceberano album), 2009
 Bittersweet (Life On Planet 9 album), 2011
 Bittersweet (Kasey Chambers album), 2014
 Bitter-Sweet (Bryan Ferry album), 2018

EPs
 Bittersweet (Aaron West and the Roaring Twenties EP), 2016
 Bitter Sweet (Majeeed EP), 2022

Songs
 "Bitter-Sweet", a 1974 song by Roxy Music from the album Country Life
 "Bitter-Sweet", a 2011 song by Alexandra Stan from the album Saxobeats
 "Bittersweet", the debut single by New Model Army from 1983
 "Bittersweet" (Hoodoo Gurus song), 1985
 "Bittersweet" (Big Head Todd and the Monsters song), 1993
 "Bittersweet" (Fuel song), 1998
 "Bittersweet" (Apocalyptica song), 2004
 "Bittersweet", a 2004 song by Falling Up from the 2004 album Crashings
 "Bitter Sweet", a song by Entwine from the 2004 album DiEversity
 "Bittersweet", a song by Within Temptation that appears on the 2003 German edition of Mother Earth
 "Bittersweet" (Miz song), 2006
 "Bittersweet" (Fantasia song), 2010
 "Bittersweet" (Sophie Ellis-Bextor song), 2010
 "Bittersweet", a song by Ellie Goulding from the 2012 soundtrack to Breaking Dawn – Part 2
 "Bittersweet" (Arashi song), 2014
"Bittersweet", a song by Mingyu and Wonwoo of Seventeen released on May 28, 2021

Others
 Backhanded compliment
 Bittersweet chocolate
 Bittersweet (color), a pinkish shade of the color orange (#FE6F5E)
 Bittersweet Creek, a stream in South Dakota
 Bittersweet (Franklin, Louisiana), listed on the NRHP in Louisiana
 Humblebrag
 Multiservice tactical brevity code - Bittersweet

See also
 Bitter Suite (disambiguation)